The following highways are numbered 688:

Canada

United States